Legislative elections were held in French Oceania on 18 January 1953, the first to the new Territorial Assembly, which replaced the Representative Assembly.

Results
The result was a victory for the Democratic Rally of the Tahitian People (RDPT) led by Pouvanaa a Oopa, which won 18 of the 25 seats. The Democratic and Socialist Union of the Resistance won five seats and the Rally of the French People two; the two parties had run together as the Union for the Defence of the Interests of French Oceania (UDIOF).

Oopa failed to win a seat in Papeete, and subsequently stated that he would complain about election fraud to the French government. Governor René Petitbon organised an official enquiry, which concluded that the allegations were unfounded.

By constituency

Aftermath
Following the elections, the Assembly convened for the first time on 14 March. Jean-Baptiste Céran-Jérusalémy, a member of the RDPT, was elected  President of the Assembly two days later.

Following a dispute in the Assembly on 10 April, a fight broke out between Noël Ilari and Alfred Poroi. Ilari then challenged Poroi to a duel, which Poroi agreed should take place at the end of the day. However, the Governor broadcast a radio message, banning it from taking place and stationing police at the homes of the two.

References

French Polynesia
Elections in French Polynesia
Legislative
French Polynesia